Balonmano Remudas, a.k.a. Rocasa Gran Canaria ACE for sponsorship reasons, is a Spanish women's handball club from Telde in the island of Gran Canaria, Canary Islands.

Founded in 1978, ten years later it was promoted to the División de Honor, where it has played since. Its best result is the first place in 2019. Remudas won the EHF Challenge Cup in 2016 and 2019.

Season to season

33 seasons in División de Honor

Trophies
 EHF European Cup (EHF Challenge Cup) : 3
2015–16 
2018–19
2021–22
 División de Honor: 1
2019
 Copa de la Reina: 2
2015, 2017
 Supercopa de España: 2
2017
2019

European record

Team

Current squad
Squad for the 2022-23 season

Goalkeepers 
 16  Silvia Navarro 
 18  Ana Belén Palomino Delgado
Wingers
RW
 4  Melania Falcón

LW
 7  Arinegua Pérez
 10  Naja Nissen Kristensen

Line players
 9  Yulisa Quevedo
 13  Alba Spugnini
 31  María Zaldua

Back players
LB
 5  Manuela Pizzo
 9  Marta Mangué
 15  María Gomes Da Costa 
CB
   Marta Siñol
 21  María González Méndez
RB
 6  Almudena Rodriguez 
 14  Seynabou Mbengue Rodríguez

Transfers
Transfers for the 2022-2023

Joining
  Marta Mangué (LB)  (from  Bourg-de-Péage Drôme Handball)  Almudena Rodriguez (RB)  (from  CS Gloria Bistrița-Năsăud)  Sabina Jacobsen (LB)  (from  HC Dunărea Brăila)  Naja Nissen Kristensen (LW) (from  Herning-Ikast Håndbold)  Lulu Guerra (GK)  (from  Elda Prestigio)Leaving
  Sabina Jacobsen (LB)  (from  Lugi HF)'' with inmediatly effect

Notable players 

 Trine Haltvik
 Charlotte Højfeldt
 Lina Krhlikar
 Anna Ljungdahl Rapp
 Marta Mangué
 Åsa Mogensen
 María Núñez
 Silvia Navarro
 Almudena Rodríguez
 Yacaira Tejeda
 Slađana Topić

References

External links
Official website

Sport in Gran Canaria
Spanish handball clubs
Handball clubs established in 1978
1978 establishments in Spain
Sports teams in the Canary Islands